Siska or Šiška may refer to:

Places
Šiška, a city quarter of Ljubliana
Siska, British Columbia, an unincorporated community and First Nations reserve in the Fraser Canyon of British Columbia, Canada
 Siska First Nation, a government of the Nlaka'pamux peoples at Siska, British Columbia

Other
 Siska (surname)
 Siska (film), a 1962 Swedish film directed by Alf Kjellin
 Siska (TV series), a German TV series
 Siska, the name of Rolly Tasker's five yachts

See also